Warrenton Historic District may refer to:
Warrenton Downtown Historic District, Warrenton, GA, listed on the NRHP in Georgia
 Warrenton Historic District (Warrenton, North Carolina), listed on the NRHP in North Carolina
 Warrenton Historic District (Warrenton, Virginia), listed on the NRHP in Virginia